2016–17 California textbook controversy over South Asian topics
California  textbook controversy over Hindu history
Creation and evolution in public education in the United States
Japanese history textbook controversies
Kanawha County textbook controversy
Korean textbook controversy
NCERT textbook controversies
Pakistani textbooks controversy
Saudi Arabian  textbook controversy
Turkish textbook controversies

See also
 Lies My Teacher Told Me
 Textbooks in the Israeli–Palestinian conflict

Textbook controversies